Alamut-e Bala Rural District is a rural district (dehestan) in Rudbar-e Alamut District, Qazvin County, Qazvin Province, Iran. At the 2006 census, its population was 4,398, in 1,485 families.  The rural district has 38 villages.

See Also 

 Dineh Kuh

References 

Rural Districts of Qazvin Province
Qazvin County